Broomball Canada, formerly the Canadian Broomball Federation (CBF), is the official governing body of the sport of broomball in Canada.

The role of the organization is to provide leadership by promoting and developing broomball and developing and coordinating programs and services designed to meet the needs of the broomball community. The philosophy of the Broomball Canada places the athlete at the heart of the organization.

The annual Canadian membership is around 19,000 registered players with another 15,000 who participate at the recreational level which includes all age groups and schooling levels including elementary school.

The Canadian national broomball teams have competed in every World Broomball Championships since its inception.

Competitive categories

Broomball Canada has four main competitive categories to classify the different sports levels and divisions that are available to all ages.

History

The exact origin of the sport has been difficult to pin point.
Broomball can be traced back to the early 1900s. The sport was played on icy surfaces about the size of today's hockey rinks, surfaces such as lakes, ponds and rivers.
The First Nations peoples are believed to have passed the sport on to the settlers.

In 1961, the Fitness and Amateur Sport Act came into force in Canada whereby the Government of Canada made an official commitment to “encourage, promote and develop fitness and amateur sport in Canada.” A few years later, the Canadian government created two new directorates: Recreation Canada, which was tasked with improving the lifestyle of Canadians, and Sport Canada, which was responsible for developing competitive sport.

The predecessor to Broomball Canada, the Canadian Broomball Federation, was founded in 1976, roughly 10 years after the enactment of the Fitness and Amateur Sport Act. During the 1975 "national broomball tournament" in Montreal, Quebec it was decided that the sport needed a governing body. The members of the Alberta Broomball Association met with representatives of other Canadian provinces and formed what became the Canadian Broomball Federation.

In the 1980s, the organization developed the National Coaching Certification Program (NCCP) to focus on Canadian youth in the sport.

Current status

Over the past half decade the sport has seen a great decline in participation, evidence of which can be seen in all age categories and levels of competition. Schools are showing less team development in both elementary and high schools in every Canadian province. 

At the Canadian Broomball Championships (CBC) there are fewer provinces participating. Quebec, Ontario, Saskatchewan and Nova Scotia/New Brunswick (together as Maritimes) currently hold the sport together. The remaining provinces, Alberta, Manitoba, Newfoundland and Labrador, and British Columbia, were once big players in the sport but have taken a step back.

The lack of participation has been blamed on lack of leadership at the higher levels of the sport. Additionally, a lack of general awareness and knowledge of the sport in schools across Canada is considered to be another contributing factor. Adding to the problem is that broomball is sometimes confused with ringette and curling. Parents tend to sign their children up for mainstream sports such as ice hockey. Although broomball is more well known in rural areas, it lacks funding to become more popular and achieve growth in urban areas.

Provincial Associations

Broomball Canada executives

National Championship results

Senior Men's

Senior Women's

Mixed

U20 Boy's

U20 Girl's

Funding
Broomball is recognized as one of the first 6 Canadian heritage sports and thus receives funding from Heritage Canada to the amount of $105,000. The funding is meant to develop and build the sport as it receives little sponsorship from companies, the remaining income to the sport is from membership fees and workshops. To continue to receive funding from Heritage Canada, the broomball federation must continue to actively seek sponsorship from corporate sponsors. While the sport is strongly supported by Heritage Canada it would prefer to reduce dependency in order to more readily finance other initiatives.

See also
 Broomball
 List of broomball teams
USA Broomball – Now represented by two different sporting bodies: All Elite Broomball (AEB) and the United States Broomball Association (USBA).
 Broomball Australia
 International Federation of Broomball Associations

References

Broomball